Anthony Sellier (born 13 November 1950) is a Trinidad former cyclist. He competed at the 1972 Summer Olympics and the 1976 Summer Olympics.

His son Christopher Sellier was also an international track cyclist.

References

1950 births
Living people
Trinidad and Tobago male cyclists
Olympic cyclists of Trinidad and Tobago
Cyclists at the 1972 Summer Olympics
Cyclists at the 1976 Summer Olympics
Place of birth missing (living people)
20th-century Trinidad and Tobago people